Collins street is a one-way street in Hobart, Tasmania. The street was named after the founding Lieutenant Governor of the Colony of Van Diemens Land,  David Collins.

References

Streets in Hobart